Ronald (Ron) Steven Lauder (born February 26, 1944) is an American businessman, billionaire, philanthropist, art collector, and political activist. He is the president of the World Jewish Congress since 2007. He and his brother, Leonard Lauder, are the sole heirs to the Estée Lauder cosmetics company, founded by their parents, Estée Lauder and Joseph Lauder, in 1946. According to Forbes, Lauder has a net worth of $4.5 billion dollars as of Sept. 2022 (number 563 on Forbes' list of billionaires)

Early life and education
Lauder was born in New York City to a Jewish family, the son of Estée Lauder and Joseph Lauder, founders of Estée Lauder Companies. He is the younger brother of Leonard Lauder, chairman of the board of the Estée Lauder Companies.

He attended the Bronx High School of Science and holds a bachelor's degree in International Business from the Wharton School of Business at the University of Pennsylvania. He studied at the University of Paris, and received a Certificate in International Business from the University of Brussels.

Career
Lauder started to work for the Estée Lauder Company in 1964 as head of the international department.  In 1984, he became a Deputy Assistant Secretary of Defense for European and NATO policy at the United States Department of Defense.

In 1986, Ronald Reagan named him as the United States Ambassador to Austria, a position he held until 1987. As ambassador, he fired diplomatic officer Felix Bloch, who later became known in connection with the Robert Hanssen espionage case.

As a Republican, he made a bid to become the mayor of New York City in 1989, losing to Rudy Giuliani in the Republican primary (Giuliani lost to David Dinkins in the general election but defeated Dinkins in 1993). His campaign managers were Roger Ailes of Fox News and Arthur Finkelstein, a strong supporter of Richard Nixon. Michael Massing, writing of this nomination race, notes that politically Lauder 'seemed out of step with most American Jews; ... he ran to the right of Rudolph Giuliani. And, on Israeli issues, he was a vocal supporter of the Likud party, with long-standing ties to Benjamin Netanyahu."  Lauder spent $14 million of his own funds on the race.  In 1994 he successfully led a campaign to place term limits on the mayor.  In the Republican primary Giuliani had 77,150 (67.0%) vote to 37,960 (33.0%) for Lauder.

In 1998, Lauder was asked by Israeli Prime Minister Benjamin Netanyahu to begin Track II negotiations with Syrian leader Hafez al-Assad; these negotiations continued after the election of Ehud Barak to the post. Lauder communicated a new-found willingness on Assad's part to make compromises with the Israelis in an overall land for peace deal, and his draft "Treaty of Peace Between Israel and Syria" formed an important part of the (ultimately fruitless) Israeli-Syrian negotiations that occurred in January 2000 in Shepherdstown, West Virginia.

Lauder manages investments in real estate and media, including Central European Media Enterprises and Israeli TV. In 2010, Lauder founded RWL Water, LLC.

Civic and philanthropic activities
Lauder has been involved with organizations, such as the Conference of Presidents of Major American Jewish Organizations, the Jewish National Fund, the World Jewish Congress, the American Jewish Joint Distribution Committee, the Anti-Defamation League, the Jewish Theological Seminary, Rabbinical College of America, Brandeis University, and the Abraham Fund. With his brother he founded the Lauder Institute at Wharton School. Lauder has also served as a finance chairman of the New York Republican State Committee.

In 2003, Lauder founded and became a president of Lauder Business School in Vienna, Austria.

Lauder led a movement to introduce term limits in the New York City Council, which were subsequently imposed on most NYC elected officials, including the Mayor and City Council, after a citywide referendum in 1993. In 1996, voters turned down a council proposal to extend term limits. Lauder spent $4 million on the two referendums. He has been involved in environmental conservation efforts in eastern Long Island and has served on the board of directors of the conservation organization Group for the East End since 2002.

Art
On November 16, 2001, Lauder opened the Neue Galerie in New York, an art museum dedicated to art from Germany and Austria from the early 20th century. It holds one of the best collections of works by Egon Schiele in the world.

On June 18, 2006, he purchased from Maria Altmann and her family, the painting Portrait of Adele Bloch-Bauer I by Gustav Klimt for $135 million, the highest price ever paid for a painting at that time. Lauder called the painting "Our Mona Lisa". He reportedly saw Klimt's portrait as a youth in Vienna and had admired it since. The painting, a Nazi-looted art piece which had just been restored to Altmann following years of negotiation and litigation with the Austrian government, now forms the centerpiece of the museum's collection.

Lauder also has the world's largest private collection of medieval and Renaissance armor.

Lauder has been criticized for failure to resolve a case involving the Museum of Modern Art (MoMA), which in 1997 exhibited some paintings owned by Rudolph Leopold, a Viennese doctor and art collector. An investigative article in The New York Times on December 24, 1997 – "A Singular Passion for Amassing Art, One Way or Another" – outlined a case involving Portrait of Wally by Egon Schiele, which was in the MoMA exhibition but was obtained by Leopold soon after the Nazi era. The New York County District Attorney (Manhattan) stepped in to help restore the piece to descendants of its original owner, but ownership of the painting is still in contention, nearly ten years later. Lauder has been accused of a failure to act on the case, despite being MoMA chairman at the time.

Lauder is an honorary trustee of the World Monuments Fund, a New York-based non-profit with the mission of protecting endangered cultural heritage sites around the world.

In 1987, Lauder established the Ronald S. Lauder Foundation, a philanthropic organization that is dedicated to rebuilding Jewish life in Central and Eastern Europe. The foundation also supports student exchange programs between New York and various capitals in Central and Eastern Europe.

In 1998, Lauder co-founded the Alzheimer's Drug Discovery Foundation with his brother, Leonard A. Lauder. Its mission it to "rapidly accelerate the discovery of drugs to prevent, treat and cure Alzheimer's disease." Ronald continues as the Foundation's co-chairman.

In 2020, Lauder gave 91 pieces of arms and armor to the Metropolitan Museum of Art. The 91-object gift is the museum's most significant since 1942. To honor the gift, the museum's entire group of Arms and Armor galleries is now named for Lauder.

President of the World Jewish Congress

Lauder was elected president of the World Jewish Congress on June 10, 2007, following the resignation of Edgar Bronfman, Sr. He beat the South African businessman Mendel Kaplan and Einat Wilf of Israel by a clear margin.

President George W. Bush appointed him to serve on the honorary delegation to accompany him to Jerusalem for the celebration of the 60th anniversary of the State of Israel in May 2008.

Lauder condemned the persecution of Rohingya Muslims in Myanmar.

Jewish activism
In July 2009, Bernie Ecclestone faced calls from Lauder to resign as Formula One chief after he had praised Adolf Hitler in a newspaper interview and said that Hitler "got things done". Lauder said someone with Ecclestone's views should not be allowed to run such an important and popular racing series. He urged Formula One teams, drivers and host countries to suspend their cooperation with him. In reaction, Ecclestone told the news agency Associated Press that "I think the people who are saying that haven't got the power to say these things." Asked if the World Jewish Congress was influential, Ecclestone said: "It's a pity they didn't sort the banks out" and "They have a lot of influence everywhere". After a public outcry, Ecclestone apologized for his remarks and said he had "been an idiot".

In December 2009, Lauder protested against the Roman Curia's decree recognizing the heroic virtues of Pope Pius XII, asserting that an eventual beatification would be inopportune until the Holy See's historical archives from the 1939–1945 period were opened.

In 2011, writing in the German newspaper Die Welt, Lauder called for Israel to be admitted into the Western defense alliance NATO: "Israel needs real guarantees for its security. European NATO member states – including Turkey – must admit the state of Israel into the Western alliance," the WJC president wrote. He referred to the uprisings in Egypt and Tunisia and said they were reminders of how "unpredictable" developments in the Middle East were. Israeli NATO membership "would send a strong signal to other countries not to take on Israel", Lauder argued.

Lauder has also been outspoken on anti-Semitism. In an opinion article entitled "Sweden's Shame", he attacked the Swedish government, church officials and media for "fanning the flames" of hatred against Jews.

In May 2012, Lauder condemned as "despicable" remarks made by the Norwegian sociologist Johan Galtung who had "revived anti-Semitic canards such as Jewish control of the media" and suggested that Israel's Mossad could have been behind the 2011 "massacres in Norway committed by Anders Breivik" in which 77 people died. Lauder declared: "There is a growing tendency to blame the Jews for all evil that happens under the sun. It is a scandal that a leading academic such as Galtung does not shy away from citing notorious forgeries such as the Protocols of the Elders of Zion to support his bigoted arguments."

In August 2012, Lauder criticized Austrian politicians for failing to publicly denounce the leader of the third-largest political party in the country, the FPÖ, Heinz-Christian Strache, who had posted an anti-Semitic cartoon on his Facebook page. "Clearly, and not for the first time, the FPÖ leader is trying to whip up anti-Semitic sentiment. His repeated denials are not credible because his words and actions speak for themselves," Ronald Lauder said in a statement, adding: "This scandal shows that anti-Jewish resentment is still widespread, and unscrupulous politicians are allowed to exploit it for electioneering purposes. That is mind-boggling, and it could have negative repercussions for Austrian Jews." The Israelitische Kultusgemeinde Wien (Vienna Israelite Community) banned Lauder for allegedly interfering in its board elections. IKG President Oskar Deutsch alleged that Lauder had offered incentives to members of the IKG to support another candidate. A Lauder spokesman denied the allegations. In January 2013, it was reported that Deutsch and Lauder had resolved their dispute.

Lauder has been strongly critical of business deals by European energy firms with Iran and called for stronger UN sanctions because of Tehran's threat against Israel and its nuclear program. In April 2008, he criticized a visit by Swiss Foreign Minister Micheline Calmy-Rey to Tehran where she met with Iran's President Mahmoud Ahmadinejad to help a Swiss company secure a multibillion-dollar contract to buy natural gas from Iran. Lauder told a press conference in Bern: "Maybe that money that Switzerland is paying to Iran will some day be used to either buy weapons to kill Israelis, or buy weapons to kill Americans, or buy missiles to be able to deliver nuclear weapons." Lauder also led diplomatic efforts to persuade European businesses to withdraw from Iran. In January 2010, he warmly welcomed the announcement by Siemens CEO Peter Löscher that his company would not seek new business in Iran.

In February 2018, the Polish Prime Minister Mateusz Morawiecki stated that "there were Jewish perpetrators" of the Holocaust, "not only German perpetrators." Lauder condemned Morawiecki's comment as anti-Semitic, saying: "The Polish prime minister [Morawiecki] has displayed appalling ignorance with his unconscionable claim that so-called 'Jewish perpetrators' were partly responsible for the Nazi German attempt to wipe out European Jewry ... this government is going to extreme and unfathomable lengths to exonerate some of their countrymen's own complicity in the murders of their neighbors. This is nothing short of an attempt to falsify history, that is one of the very worst forms of anti-Semitism and Holocaust obfuscation. We demand an immediate retraction and apology from the Polish government of these absurd and offensive remarks.".

in 2019, Lauder launched the Antisemitism Accountability Project (ASAP) to fund campaigns fighting federal, state, and local candidates who support or promote antisemitism.

Conservative activism and donations
Lauder had donated $1.1 million in 2016 to Secure America Now (SAN). In the same year, SAN broadcast anti-Muslim social media videos in swing states just before the U.S. elections. Lauder disavowed the videos; a spokesman said that he had donated to the group "support their work in opposition to the Iran nuclear deal" (which had concluded in 2015) and "had nothing to do with any of the group's other activities"; the spokesman said that Lauder supported "interfaith respect and dialogue" and "would never be involved with insulting people of faith." The videos at issue may have been targeted at increasing turnout among supporters of Donald Trump.

Lauder is a longtime Republican Party donor. Since 2016, Lauder has donated more than $1.6 million to pro-Donald Trump organizations. In 2020, Lauder donated $1.7 million to a new independent expenditure group that opposed criminal justice reform in New York.

Lauder pitched the idea to Trump to buy Greenland in 2019 from Denmark.  In the proposal he proposed to be the immediary in the transaction which Denmark rejected.  His involvement was first reported in a 2022 book The Divider by Peter Baker and his wife Susan Glasser.

His brother supported Kathy Hochul's successful campaign for New York governor in 2022, but Ronald himself gave $11 million to the Republican challenger Lee Zeldin.

Israel activism
Lauder has repeatedly come to the defense of Israel in public and is seen as an ally of Prime Minister Benjamin Netanyahu. In May 2012, he reacted "with dismay" at a suggestion by Ireland's Deputy Prime Minister and Foreign Minister Eamon Gilmore to impose a European Union-wide import ban on products made in Israeli settlements in the West Bank, which Gilmore said were "illegal" and made peace between Israel and the Palestinians "impossible". Lauder said: "Such boycott calls are cynical and hypocritical. Minister Gilmore is taking aim at the only liberal democracy in the Middle East while keeping quiet about those who really wreak havoc in the region: the Assads, Ahmadinejads and their allies Hezbollah and Hamas." He added that "the West Bank territories are legally disputed and not illegally occupied."

In remarks to the International Council of Jewish Parliamentarians made on June 28, 2011, Lauder reportedly scolded Israeli Prime Minister Benjamin Netanyahu for a number of missteps, including lacking a diplomatic plan heading into the September UN vote on Palestinian statehood and setting preconditions for negotiations as part of the Israeli–Palestinian peace process, according to Haaretz. However, in June 2012, on the third anniversary of Israeli Prime Minister Benjamin Netanyahu's speech at Bar-Ilan University, Lauder published a full-page advertisement in The Wall Street Journal and other newspapers in which he called on Palestinian President Mahmoud Abbas to return to the negotiating table. "Accept the offer to talk, President Abbas. It takes two sides to make peace," Lauder wrote.

Channel 10
Lauder has participated in a number of large media deals in Israel, among which was his purchase of part of commercial television Channel 10.

In September 2011, Israeli media published accounts that Lauder had put heavy pressure on the executives of the channel to broadcast a personal apology to the businessman Sheldon Adelson with regard to a profile that the channel had broadcast in January 2011. The apology read, "After the broadcast of the piece, we checked the accusations. Our checks revealed that the accusations were – and are – completely false ... We are very regretful that we did not check these accusations before broadcasting them." Lauder's forcing of the form of the apology led to the resignation of the channel's news chief Reudor Benziman, its news editor Ruti Yuval, and its presenter Guy Zohar (who continues in another post in Channel 10), who criticized Lauder for the pressure he exerted. Because of the attacks, detailed above, on Lauder (who had been until then the last major funder of the channel), he decided to reconsider his financial support. If the channel lost his funding, it would have difficulty continuing to operate to its current standard past October 2011.

On November 3, 2011, The Second Authority for Television and Radio reached a decision on the issue in which it decided that the apology to Adelson broadcast by the channel was appropriate and that "no evidence has been presented that there was any intervention by the shareholders of Channel 10 on new content, or even on the text of the apology, which was agreed between the news company and the person injured by the broadcast".

Personal life
Lauder is married to Jo Carole (Knopf) Lauder. They have two children, Aerin and Jane.

Lauder's daughter Jane is married to Kevin Warsh, a former member of the Federal Reserve Board of Governors.

In 1985 he published a book titled Fighting Violent Crime in America.

A 2007 profile of Lauder in The New Yorker magazine detailed his residences, including three properties in Manhattan – a townhouse on East 70th Street, the Rockefeller Guest House on East 52nd Street, as well as an apartment at 740 Park Avenue. The profile additionally listed homes in Florida, London, Paris, and Wainscott, Long Island.

Honors 
 2011: Andrew Carnegie Medal of Philanthropy
 2018: Andrey Sheptytsky Medal
 2018: Harvey Prize awarded in 2019

See also
 CME/Lauder v. Czech Republic
 Lauder – Morasha School

References

Further reading 
 Lauder, RS. Fighting Violent Crime in America. Dodd Mead (April 1985). 
 Anne-Marie O'Connor. The Lady in Gold: The Extraordinary Tale of Gustav Klimt's Masterpiece, Portrait of Adele Bloch-Bauer. Alfred A. Knopf, New York 2012,

External links

World Jewish Congress
Lauder Institute
Chairman of the Board Ronald S. Lauder of the Jewish National Fund
President Ronald S. Lauder of the World Jewish Congress, elected June 2007
Profile at Central European Media Enterprises
RWL Water Group
Profile at Forbes

Ronald Lauder collected news and coverage at The New York Observer

1944 births
Living people
20th-century American businesspeople
20th-century American diplomats
20th-century American politicians
20th-century art collectors
21st-century American businesspeople
21st-century art collectors
Activists from New York (state)
Ambassadors of the United States to Austria
American billionaires
American chairpersons of corporations
American company founders
American cosmetics businesspeople
American people of Czech-Jewish descent
American people of Hungarian-Jewish descent
American political activists
American political fundraisers
American retail chief executives
American Zionists
Art museum people
The Bronx High School of Science alumni
Businesspeople from New York City
Channel 10 (Israeli TV channel)
Conservative Party of New York State politicians
Heads of universities in Austria
Free University of Brussels (1834–1969) alumni
International Emmy Directorate Award
Jewish American art collectors
Jewish American philanthropists
Jewish American people in New York (state) politics

Lauder family
Museum founders
New York (state) Republicans
People associated with the Museum of Modern Art (New York City)
People from the Upper East Side
Philanthropists from New York (state)
Politicians from New York City
Wharton School of the University of Pennsylvania alumni
United States Department of Defense officials
University and college founders
University of Paris alumni